The following is a list of events affecting Canadian television in 1978. Events listed include television show debuts, finales, cancellations, and channel launches.

Events

Debuts

Ending this year

Television shows

1950s
Country Canada (1954–2007)
CBC News Magazine (1952–1981)
The Friendly Giant (1958–1985)
Hockey Night in Canada (1952–present)
The National (1954–present)
Front Page Challenge (1957–1995)
Wayne and Shuster Show (1958–1989)

1960s
CTV National News (1961–present)
Land and Sea (1964–present)
Man Alive (1967–2000)
Mr. Dressup (1967–1996)
The Nature of Things (1960–present, scientific documentary series)
Question Period (1967–present, news program)
Reach for the Top (1961–1985)
Take 30 (1962–1983)
The Tommy Hunter Show (1965–1992)
University of the Air (1966–1983)
W-FIVE (1966–present, newsmagazine program)

1970s
The Beachcombers (1972–1990)
Canada AM (1972–present, news program)
Canadian Express (1977–1980)
Celebrity Cooks (1975–1984)
City Lights (1973–1989)
Definition (1974–1989)
the fifth estate (1975–present, newsmagazine program)
A Gift To Last (1976–1979)
Grand Old Country (1975–1981)
Headline Hunters (1972–1983)
King of Kensington (1975–1980)
Let's Go (1976–1984)
The Magic Lie (1977–1979)
Marketplace (1972–present, newsmagazine program)
Ombudsman (1974–1980)
Science Magazine (1975–1979)
Second City Television (1976–1984)
This Land (1970–1982)
V.I.P. (1973–1983)
The Watson Report (1975–1981)
100 Huntley Street (1977–present, religious program)

TV movies
Catsplay
Drying Up the Streets
Dying Hard
A Matter of Choice
One Night Stand
Scoop
Seer Was Here
Tyler

Television stations

Debuts

Closures

See also
 1978 in Canada
 List of Canadian films

References